Frederick Charles may refer to:

Royalty and nobility
 Prince Frederick Charles of Prussia (1828–1885)
 Prince Frederick Charles of Hesse (1868–1940)
 Friedrich Karl von Schönborn (1674–1746), Bishop of Würzburg
 Frederick Charles, Duke of Württemberg-Winnental
 Frederick Charles, Count of Erbach-Limpurg (1680–1731)
 Frederick Charles, Prince of Stolberg-Gedern (1693–1767)
 Frederick Charles, Prince of Schwarzburg-Rudolstadt (1736–1793)
 Frederick Charles, Duke of Schleswig-Holstein-Sonderburg-Plön (1706–1761)

Others
 Fred Charles (Manitoba politician), Canadian politician
 Fred Charles (footballer), English association football (soccer) player active in the 1910s
 Frederick Charles (designer) (1909–?), British industrial designer

See also
 Charles Frederick (disambiguation)